The grey-mantled wren (Odontorchilus branickii) is a species of bird in the family Troglodytidae. It is found in Bolivia, Colombia, Ecuador, and Peru.

Taxonomy and systematics

The grey-mantled wren shares its genus with one other species, the tooth-billed wren (Odontorchilus cinereous). Some authors have suggested that they are conspecific or that they form a superspecies. The grey-mantled wren has two subspecies, the nominate Odontorchilus branickii branickii and O. b. minor.

Description

The nominate adult has a tawny forecrown and a darker brown crown the merges into the gray of its back, which is browner on the rump. The tail is medium gray with prominent black bars and a white bar near the end. It has a faint grayish brown supercilium and the face and sides of the neck are also grayish brown. The throat, breast, and belly are white slightly tinged with buff, and the flanks are grayish. The adult O. b. minor is similar but the barring on the tail is reduced on the central feathers. The juvenile has more of a buff wash on the breast than the adult but is otherwise similar.

Distribution and habitat

The nominate grey-mantled wren has a discontinuous range in the southern part of Colombia's Eastern Andes and on the eastern slope of the main Andes through Ecuador and Peru to Bolivia's La Paz Department. It inhabits the canopy and sub-canopy of humid montane forest.

Behavior

Feeding

No details are known about the grey-mantled wren's diet beyond that the species is insectivorous. It forages  up in the canopy by constantly moving along branches while probing moss and lichens for prey. It usually is part of a mixed-species foraging flock.

Breeding

The grey-mantled wren's nest and eggs have not been documented. Its relative the tooth-billed wren is thought to nest in tree cavities, so grey-mantled might do so.

Vocalization
The grey-mantled wren's typical song is "a short dry trill". It also sings "a series of whistled notes".

Status
The IUCN has assessed the grey-mantled wren as being of Least Concern. However, it "usually is considered to be uncommon or even rare" and "its population is suspected to be in decline".

References

grey-mantled wren
Birds of the Colombian Andes
Birds of the Ecuadorian Andes
Birds of the Peruvian Andes
grey-mantled wren
grey-mantled wren
Taxonomy articles created by Polbot